The  is an electric multiple unit (EMU) commuter train type operated by the private railway operator Keio Corporation in the Tokyo area of Japan since 29 September 2017. A total of six ten-car trainsets were built by J-TREC. The trains feature rotating seats that can be arranged longitudinally for daytime services and in forward-facing transverse pairs for reserved-seat Keio Liner commuter services in the evenings which started on 22 February 2018.

Design
Designed by Kazuhiko Saito and Taro Shiono, the Keio 5000 series is designed to be used in a broad range of scenarios by pursuing high degrees of ride quality. The interior features motifs inspired by the trees of Mount Takao. The train type was a recipient of the Good Design Award in 2017.

Formation
The ten-car trains are formed as follows, with six motored ("M") cars and four non-powered trailer ("T") cars, and car 10 at the Shinjuku (eastern) end.

Cars 2, 3, 6, 8, and 9 each have one single-arm pantograph.

Interior
LED lighting is used in the interiors, and pairs of LCD passenger information screens are provided both above the doorways and suspended from the ceilings. Free WiFi and AC power sockets are provided. Space for wheelchairs and pushchairs are provided in each car.

History
Details of the new trains were officially announced in March 2016. Between April and May 2017, Keio held a public poll to choose the brand name for the new reserved-seat services starting in spring 2018. The name Keio Liner was announced on 24 January 2018, chosen from the following five candidates.

 
 
 
 Luxpress
 Westar
The fleet of five ten-car 5000 series trainsets was built by Japan Transport Engineering Company ("J-TREC") at a total cost of approximately JPY10 billion.

The first trainset was delivered to Wakabadai Depot from the J-TREC factory in Yokohama in late June 2017, and unveiled to the media on 19 July 2017. It entered revenue service on 29 September 2017. The fifth set was in service by January 2018.

Reserved-seat Keio Liner services from Shinjuku Station commenced on 22 February 2018. Inbound Keio Liner trains to Shinjuku will begin on 22 February 2019.

The order of a sixth set was announced in April 2019. The set was delivered in December 2019.

Future plans 
Keio plans to upgrade the seats on the 5000 series to include a reclining function. The program aims to begin revenue operation later in 2022. 

The updated seating was installed on a new 7th set. This new set, 5737, debuted on 24 December 2022.

Build histories

The manufacturers and delivery dates for the fleet are as shown below.

See also
 Seibu 40000 series, a Seibu Railway commuter EMU type that also features rotating longitudinal/transverse seating
 Tobu 50090 series and 70090 series, Tobu Railway commuter EMU types that also feature rotating longitudinal/transverse seating
Keikyu N1000 series, a Keikyu commuter EMU type that features rotating transverse seating (batches 20 and 21 only)
Kintetsu 5800 series, the first EMU commuter trains delivered with rotating longitudinal/transverse seating
 Kintetsu 5820 series, a similar type with changing seat configurations operating for Kintetsu Railway, the curators of the design

References

External links

 Official news release 

Electric multiple units of Japan
5002 series
Train-related introductions in 2017
1500 V DC multiple units of Japan
J-TREC multiple units